One Breath is the second album of British singer-songwriter Anna Calvi, released on 7 October 2013, by Domino Records. The album was recorded at Black Box studios in France with mixing completed in Texas by Calvi's new producer John Congleton.

Calvi described One Breath as "the moment before you've got to open yourself up, and it's about how terrifying that is. It's scary and it's thrilling. It's also full of hope, because whatever has to happen hasn't happened yet." Domino has described 'One Breath' as a "bold and confident record that begins an exciting new chapter in this uniquely talented artist's career".

The trailer for One Breath, credited to longtime collaborator Emma Nathan, was released on 5 August 2013. The artwork for the album was created by photographer Roger Deckker.

Music Week awarded Calvi their Album of the Week for One Breath. The album was nominated for the 2014 Mercury Prize.

Singles

The first single from One Breath, titled "Eliza", premiered on Monday 19 August 2013 on Lauren Laverne's BBC Radio 6 show at 11am. The song was well received by This Is Fake DIY calling it "a cinematic strum of a lead track". It was officially released digitally and on vinyl on 1 October 2013 featuring the non-album track "A Kiss To Your Twin" as the B-side. The Special Edition LP also included a bonus 7" featuring two new songs: "Endless World" and "1970s Wind".

"Suddenly", the second single from One Breath (backed by Calvi's cover of Fire) was released on 7" vinyl and digitally on 23 December 2013.

The third single, "Piece by Piece" was released as a digital-only single on 31 March 2014 and featured no B-side.

Track listing

Personnel 

Anna Calvi – vocals (lead), guitar, vibraphone
Mally Harpaz – marimba, vibraphone, harmonium, dulcimer
Daniel Maiden-Wood – drums, vocals (backing), marimba, guitar percussion
John Baggot - synths, organ, moog bass, piano, prepared piano
Fiona Brice - string arrangements, conducting

Charts

References 

2013 albums
Anna Calvi albums
Domino Recording Company albums
Albums produced by John Congleton